Lloyd Scott is an English fundraiser for charities and former footballer.

Other people with the same name include:
 Lloyd Scott (musician) (born 1902), American jazz musician
 Lloyd Scott (baseball), baseball player in the 1930s